NGC 825 is an unbarred spiral galaxy in the constellation Cetus, estimated to be 154 million light-years away. The object was discovered by the astronomer Albert Marth on November 18, 1863.

See also 
 List of NGC objects (1–1000)

References

External links 
 

Unbarred spiral galaxies
0825
Cetus (constellation)
008173